This is a list of Roman castra in Romania. They were built by the Roman army following the conquests of Moesia, Scythia Minor and Dacia, parts of which are now found in the territory of modern Romania. The Latin word castra, with its singular castrum, was used by the ancient Romans to mean buildings or plots of land reserved to or constructed for use as a military defensive position. Many of these castra were part of various limes (a border defense or delimiting system).

The castra not yet identified, have the name of the modern location in italics and parenthesis (i.e. (Pietroasele)), while major ones are in bold (i.e. Porolissum).

See also 
 List of castra
 List of ancient cities in Thrace and Dacia
 Roman Dacia
 Castra
 Roman legion
 Cohort
 Romanian archaeology
 List of castles in Romania

Notes

References

Ancient

Modern

Further reading 
 Armata în sud-vestul Daciei romane, de Eduard Nemeth
 Castrul de la Poiana și drumul roman prin Moldova de Jos, de Vasile Pârvan
 Dacia Felix (Istoria Daciei romane), de Adrian Bejan 
 Drumuri și cetăți romane în Banat, de Traian Simu
 Geto-dacii în configurația demografică a Daciei romane, de Paul Damian
 Itinerarium Pictum Annotatum (reconstruction)
 Lista monumentelor istorice
 Localități în care s-a descoperit ceramică de factură dacică, de Paul Damian
 Orașele romane din Dacia
 Ravennatis Anonymi Cosmographia – liber IV
 Repertoriul Arheologic Național
 Repertoriul descoperirilor monetare de tip PROVINCIA DACIA, de Claudiu MUNTEANU
 Repertoriul fortificațiilor de pe râpa nordică a limesului Dunării de Jos în epoca romană târzie, de Dorel Bondoc
 Speciile arboricole simbolizate pe Columnă și traseele trupelor romane în cele două campanii dacice, de Gligor Hașa
 Strategii defensive și politici transfrontaliere. Integrarea spațiului Dunării de Jos în civilizația romană (STRATEG) 
 Trupe fără castre, castre fără trupe în Dacia, de Dan Matei

External links 

 Roman castra in Romania – Google Maps
 Roman castra in Romania – Google Earth
 Roman army 
 Roman occupation army in Dacia

Roman Dacia
Roman frontiers
Forts in Romania
Moesia
Castra
Roman towns and cities in Romania
Roman fortifications in Romania